Gitana (English Gypsy) is the fifth studio album by Mexican pop singer Daniela Romo. It was released in 1987. Like her previous albums, it was also a great success for her career, with several, of the songs making an impact on the Latin billboard charts.

History
This is a production from Gian Pietro Felisatti and Miguel Blasco. It was recorded in Italy and Spain. It has songs written by Juan Gabriel, José María Purón, Armando Manzanero and Pablo Pinilla, among others. The song that gives the title of the album was written by Daniela with Felisatti, besides "Hay un sitio libre en mi corazón" (There's a spot free in my heart) is the 2nd duet with Mijares.

Track listing
Tracks:
 Es mejor perdonar
 Diez minutos de amor
 Lo que las mujeres callamos
 Tanto esperar por tí
 Gitana
 Hay un sitio libre en mi corazón (Duet with Mijares)
 Ese momento
 El poder del amor
 El diablo en mi tejado
 Cuando empieza el amor

Singles
"Gitana" reached #12 on Hot Latin Songs.
"Es mejor perdonar" reached #6 on Hot Latin Songs.
"Hay un sitio libre en mi corazón"

References

1987 albums
Daniela Romo albums